Greta Jiehan Lee (born March 7, 1983) is an American actress.

Early life
Lee was born and raised in Los Angeles, California. Her parents are Korean immigrants. 

While attending Harvard-Westlake School, she became interested in the performing arts. After high school, she studied communication and theater at Northwestern University. She then moved to New York City to pursue acting.

Career
Lee made her Broadway debut in 2007 as high-achieving, multilingual honor student Marcy Park (replacement) in The 25th Annual Putnam County Spelling Bee and in 2010, appeared in La Bête as Dorine. She has played Soojin in Girls and Homeless Heidi in High Maintenance. She was a guest star in the TV shows New Girl and Wayward Pines. She costarred as Hae Won in Sisters alongside Tina Fey and Amy Poehler. Lee starred as Maxine in the Netflix comedy-drama series Russian Doll and as Stella Bak in the Apple TV+ drama series The Morning Show. Lee also starred as Nora in the 2023 film Past Lives.

Personal life 
Lee is married to Russ Armstrong, with whom she has two sons.

Filmography

Television

Film

References

External links

1983 births
Living people
21st-century American actresses
American actresses of Korean descent
American film actresses
American television actresses
Northwestern University School of Communication alumni